Pieter Korteweg (29 December 1888 – 13 September 1970) was a Dutch philatelist who was added to the Roll of Distinguished Philatelists in 1962.

Philately
Korteweg was a specialist in the philately of his own country, particularly the postmarks, and he published several books and more than 2000 articles on Dutch philately. He was the editor of the Dutch philatelic magazine De Philatelist which he developed in the 1930s until it became the official journal of ten Netherlands philatelic associations.

In 1932 Korteweg gave a lecture in the large auditorium of the Colonial Institute in Amsterdam titled "The Indian post in earlier centuries (the Company's post, etc.)" This was attended by hundreds of members of the Royal Antiquarian Society and the Society Amstelodamum.

He was elected a member of the Royal Philatelic Society London in 1930 and subsequently became a fellow of that society.

Family
Korteweg was born in Groningen. His father was a professor of surgery. Pieter married Carolina Johanna van Hasselt in 1913 and they had two daughters and a son. Korteweg died in Bennebroek.

Awards
Costerus Medal, 1934. (first person to be awarded this medal)
Roll of Distinguished Philatelists. 1962.

Selected publications
Proevenboek. Amsterdam, 1931.
De Kleinrondstempels van Nederland. De Philatelist, Rotterdam, 1933.
300 Jaar Postmerken Van Nederland 1570-1870. Netherlands, 1957.

References

Signatories to the Roll of Distinguished Philatelists
1888 births
1970 deaths
Dutch philatelists
Philately of the Netherlands
Fellows of the Royal Philatelic Society London
People from Groningen (city)